The Select Committee on the Modernisation of the House of Commons (frequently shortened to Modernisation of the House of Commons Committee) was a temporary select committee of the House of Commons in the Parliament of the United Kingdom that was created early in the 1997, 2001, and 2005 Parliaments. It ceased to exist at the end of the 2005–10 Parliament, and the Government chose not to propose its reappointment in the Parliament following the 2010 election.

The Committee was first established on 4 June 1997 for the life of the Parliament with a remit to "consider how the practices and procedures of the House should be modernised, and to make recommendations thereon". It was composed of 15 MPs and chaired by the Leader of the House of Commons. It was recreated on 16 July 2001 and 13 July 2005 on similar terms.

See also
List of Committees of the United Kingdom Parliament

References

External links
Select Committee on the Modernisation of the House of Commons
Records for this Committee are held at the Parliamentary Archives

Defunct Select Committees of the British House of Commons